Laue is a lunar impact crater that lies across the south-southwestern rim and interior floor of the huge walled plain Lorentz. This feature is located on the Moon's far side, just beyond the west-northwestern limb.  Under conditions of favorable libration and illumination from the Sun, this area can be seen at a very oblique angle from the Earth.

This is a moderately worn crater formation with several small craters along the rim. The largest of these is a small crater that intrudes slightly into the northeastern rim. A cup-shaped crater lies along the east-southeastern inner wall. The interior wall is generally less wide along the northern side than elsewhere, which may have been the result of the terrain in which the impact was formed.

There is a pair of low central ridges offset just to the south of the crater midpoint. A small, cup-shaped crater lies within the interior floor to the north-northwest of the center. The remainder of the floor is relatively level, but is marked by a number of small craters.

Satellite craters
By convention these features are identified on lunar maps by placing the letter on the side of the crater midpoint that is closest to Laue.

References

 
 
 
 
 
 
 
 
 
 
 
 

Impact craters on the Moon